The 11th Pan American Games were held in Havana, Cuba from August 2 to August 18, 1991. Aruba made its debut at the Pan Am Games.

See also
 Aruba at the 1992 Summer Olympics

Nations at the 1991 Pan American Games
P
1991